The women's 200 metre freestyle competition of the swimming events at the 1951 Pan American Games took place on 2 March.

This race consisted of four lengths of the pool, all in freestyle.

Results
All times are in minutes and seconds.

Heats

Final 
The final was held on March 2.

References

Swimming at the 1951 Pan American Games
Pan